Quitman Independent School District is an Independent school district based in Quitman, Texas.

In 2015, the district was rated Met Standard by the Texas Education Agency.

References

External links 

School districts in Wood County, Texas